Borislav or Boryslav (Cyrillic script: Борислав) is a Slavic male given name.

People who have this name include:
Borislav Cvetković, a Croatian-born Serbian football manager and former player
Borislav Ivanov, a Bulgarian chess player
Borislav Ivkov, a Serbian chess Grandmaster
Borislav Mihaylov, a Bulgarian former football goalkeeper
Borislav Stanković, a Serbian former basketball player and coach
Borislav Tomoski, a Macedonian international football player

Slavic masculine given names
Serbian masculine given names
Bulgarian masculine given names
Polish masculine given names